Dean Devlin (born August 27, 1962) is an American screenwriter, producer, director, and actor of film and television. He is best known for his collaborations with director Roland Emmerich, and for his work on the Librarian and Leverage television franchises. He is a co-founder of the production companies Centropolis Entertainment and Electric Entertainment.

Early life
Devlin was born in New York City, the son of actress Pilar Seurat and Don Devlin, a writer, actor, and producer. His father was Jewish and his mother was Filipino. He attended the University of Southern California.

Career

Film
Devlin appeared as an actor on numerous television shows throughout the 1980s. He also appeared in films including My Bodyguard, The Wild Life, Real Genius and Martians Go Home. Due to his youthful appearance, Devlin often played teenage characters despite being in his 20s.

Devlin gradually began writing scripts. His first produced screenplay was for Universal Soldier. He reached prominence as a writer/producer working alongside director Roland Emmerich, with whom he teamed after appearing in Emmerich's film Moon 44. Together they cowrote and produced Stargate, the first movie to have a web site. The team then produced Independence Day and Godzilla. They split following the 2000 Mel Gibson film The Patriot, but re-teamed to film Independence Day: Resurgence in 2016. Devlin has also produced Cellular, Who Killed the Electric Car?, and Flyboys.

Devlin's directorial debut was the action sci-fi film Geostorm for Warner Bros. The film was set for a March 2016 release, later rescheduled for October 2017. It starred Gerard Butler as the lead with Jim Sturgess, Abbie Cornish, Ed Harris and Andy García. The film made $221 million on a $120 million budget. In March 2018, Deadline Hollywood calculated the film lost Warner Bros. $71.6 million when factoring in all other expenses and revenues.

Devlin's second film as director was the 2018 thriller Bad Samaritan, starring Robert Sheehan and David Tennant.

Television
Devlin produced The Triangle miniseries, Leverage (of which he has directed twelve episodes), The Librarian franchise, and The Outpost. He also co-created The Visitor series.

In 2019 Devlin began working with the Philippine media conglomerate ABS-CBN to produce a new series called Almost Paradise (originally titled Off Tropic.) The series premiered in the United States on May 30, 2020, on WGN America, and premiered on Kapamilya Channel in 2021. It was filmed entirely in the Philippines and the majority of the cast members are Filipino, aside from the lead—played by Christian Kane, whom Devlin also worked with on the television shows Leverage and The Librarians.

Delvin produced The Ark TV series for Syfy, which aired starting in February 2023.

Video games
Devlin was an advisor to the video game company ZeniMax Media from 1999 to 2004. Additionally Devlin was involved in video game projects The 10th Planet and Godzilla Online.

Personal life 
Devlin is married to actress Lisa Brenner.

Filmography

Television 
The numbers in directing and writing credits refer to the number of episodes.

Acting roles

Awards and nominations

References

External links

Snider, John C. (December 2, 2008). "Podcast #20 – Dean Devlin". SciFiDimensions.

1962 births
Film producers from New York (state)
American male actors of Filipino descent
American male film actors
American male screenwriters
American people of Jewish descent
Living people
Male actors from New York City
University of Southern California alumni
Screenwriters from New York (state)
American independent film production company founders
American film directors of Filipino descent
American television directors
American film producers
American film production company founders
American television producers
American television writers
Skydance Media people